Kamiane may stand for:

 Kamiane, Sumy Oblast, a village in Sumy Oblast of Ukraine
 Kamiane, Luhansk Oblast, an urban-type settlement in Luhansk Oblast of Ukraine
 Kamiane, Zaporizhzhia Oblast, an urban-type settlement in Zaporizhzhia Oblast of Ukraine